The Cal 2-25 (also called the Cal 25-2 and Cal 25 Mark II) is an American sailboat that was designed by C. William Lapworth as a cruiser-racer and first built in 1977.

The design was marketed by the manufacturer as the 2-25 to differentiate it from the unrelated 1965 Cal 25 design.

Production
The design was built by Cal Yachts, part of Jensen Marine and Bangor Punta, in the United States. A total of 392 examples  were built between 1977 and 1983, but it is now out of production.

The design was also produced under license in Brazil as the Martinique 25.

Design
The Cal 2-25 is a recreational keelboat, built predominantly of fiberglass, with teak wood trim and painted aluminum spars. It has a masthead sloop rig, a raked stem, a vertical transom, an internally mounted spade-type rudder mounted well aft, controlled by a tiller wit an extension and a fixed fin keel. It displaces  and carries  of ballast.

The boat's galley is located on both sides of the cabin. On the port side is a stainless steel sink and on the starboard a two-burner alcohol stove, which slides under the cockpit for stowage, along with a section of the counter. The head is a chemical type, with a marine toilet optional. It has a privacy door and it located forward, just aft of the bow "V"-berth. Additional sleeping space is provided by the dinette settee, which has a folding table, plus a berth under the sliding stove for a total sleeping accommodation for five people.

Ventilation is provided by a flush-mounted forward hatch and two opening ports in the head, while the cabin ports are fixed.

The boat has internally-mounted halyards, with internally-mounted reefing and an outhaul. The cockpit has two genoa winches and a third winch for the halyards. There is a standard boom vang and mainsheet traveler, which is mounted on the bridge deck. There is an anchor locker in the bow.

Operational history
The Cal 2-25 was mostly sailed as a cruising sailboat and was not widely raced.

In a 1994 review, Richard Sherwood wrote, "Bill Lapworth designs boats with long waterlines, spade rudders, and moderate to light displacement. The result is a compromise between a cruiser and a racer."

In a 2010 review Steve Henkel wrote, "There is a large Cal 25 ... racing group and fan club centered up and down the West Coast, but they spurn the [2-25], which is a totally different design (though with a similar average PHRF rating). Best features: The Cal [2-25] is a well built boat with good headroom and a relatively roomy head. Worst features: No significant problems."

See also
List of sailing boat types

Similar sailboats
Beachcomber 25
Bayfield 25
Bombardier 7.6
C&C 25
Catalina 25
Catalina 250
Capri 25
Com-Pac 25
Dufour 1800
Freedom 25
Hunter 25.5
Kelt 7.6
MacGregor 25
Merit 25
Mirage 25
Northern 25
O'Day 25
Outlaw 26
Redline 25
Sirius 26
Tanzer 25
Tanzer 7.5
US Yachts US 25
Watkins 25

References

Keelboats
1970s sailboat type designs
Sailing yachts
Sailboat type designs by Bill Lapworth
Sailboat types built by Cal Yachts